Lobostemon is a genus of flowering plants belonging to the family Boraginaceae. Its native range is South Africa. The majority of species are limited to the winter rainfall area of the country, from Springbok to Mossel Bay. In Afrikaans these species are known as agtdaegeneesbos, or loosely translated, bush that will heal in eight days. As this name suggests, many species have medicinal properties. This is best known from Lobostemon fruticosus, which is used for treating wounds, blood poisoning, ringworm, skin diseases and syphilis.

Taxonomy 
This genus belongs to the forget-me-not family, Boraginaceae. It is closely relaated to the European genus Echium but differs by the presence of staminal scales in Lobostemon. The genus name is derived from Latin lobos, meaning lobe, and the Greek word stemon, meaning stamen.

Description 
This genus is made up of perennial shrubs with alternate leaves that may be hairless or hairy. Plants become densely flowered in early spring. The flowers have 5 sepals, petals, and stamens and are usually bell-shaped. The sepals are mostly free (unfused) and are often dissimilar in size. The staminal filaments are typically well-developed, but they may be reduced to ridges or mere swellings and hairy. The stamen filaments are free from petals or variously fused above staminal scales.

Distribution and habitat 
This genus is endemic to South Africa. It is confined to the winter rainfall area from Springbok to Mossel Bay, but several species have ranges that extend further eastward along the coast to about Makhanda, where rain occurs throughout the year.

Ecology 
Plants in this genus are resprouters, re-emerging most frequently after a fire. The majority of the species in this genus are pollinated by insects, although those with red flowers tend to be pollinated by birds instead.

Species 
The following species are recognised:

Blue rocket bugloss Lobostemon argenteus 
Gouriqua lobostemon Lobostemon belliformis 
Brush healthbush Lobostemon capitatus 
Ash healthbush Lobostemon cinereus 
Pajama bush Lobostemon collinus 
Largeflower healthbush Lobostemon curvifolius 
Infanta healthbush Lobostemon daltonii 
Rooiberg healthbush Lobostemon decorus 
Common healthbush Lobostemon echioides 
Eightday healthbush Lobostemon fruticosus 
Renoster healthbush Lobostemon glaber 
Smooth-leaved bush bugloss Lobostemon glaucophyllus 
Robertson healthbush Lobostemon gracilis 
Helderberg healthbush Lobostemon hottentoticus 
Arid healthbush Lobostemon laevigatus 
Limestone healthbush Lobostemon lucidus 
Kleinkaroo healthbush Lobostemon marlothii 
Turquoise bush bugloss Lobostemon montanus 
Ugly eightday curebush Lobostemon muirii 
Hairy healthbush Lobostemon oederifolius 
Horrid healthbush Lobostemon paniculatus 
Heuwel healthbush Lobostemon paniculiformis 
Kloof healthbush Lobostemon regulariflorus 
Potberg eightday curebush Lobostemon sanguineus 
Karoo healthbush Lobostemon stachydeus 
Western Karoo healthbush Lobostemon strigosus 
Bokkeveld healthbush Lobostemon trichotomus 
Eastern healthbush Lobostemon trigonus

References

Boraginaceae
Boraginaceae genera